Saint Rémy is a commune in the Calvados department in the Normandy region in northwestern France. Until 1968 an iron mine was exploited in the village.

Population

See also
Communes of the Calvados department

References

Communes of Calvados (department)
Calvados communes articles needing translation from French Wikipedia